Amanda Rochelle Penix (born September 15, 1978) is a model from Oklahoma who was crowned Miss Oklahoma Teen USA 1997 and Miss Oklahoma USA 2000. Penix was also a finalist in Miss Teen USA 1997 and received an honorable mention in Miss USA 2000.

Personal life 
Hailing from Oklahoma, United States, Penix attended Bethel High School in Shawnee, Oklahoma until 1996. Four years later, Penix graduated from Oklahoma Baptist University with a degree in early childhood education.  In 2000, Penix worked for Randy's Signs, her parents' company.  Penix is heavily involved in charity work, and actively speaks to teens about abstaining from sex until marriage.

Awards 
Earned an academic and art scholarship from Oklahoma Baptist University
Graduated from high school in three years, earning the title of Salutatorian
Riddle Scholarship
Who's Who Among American High School Students

References

External links 
Miss Oklahoma USA and Miss Oklahoma Teen USA

1978 births
Living people
People from Shawnee, Oklahoma
1997 beauty pageant contestants
20th-century Miss Teen USA delegates
Miss USA 2000 delegates
American beauty pageant winners
20th-century American people